Natalia Andreyevna Vodopyanova (born 4 June 1981) is a Russian basketball player. She was part of the Russian teams that won bronze medals at the 2004 and 2008 Olympics and placed fourth in 2012; she also won the European title in 2007 and a silver medal at the 2006 World Championships.

References

Living people
Russian women's basketball players
Basketball players at the 2004 Summer Olympics
Basketball players at the 2008 Summer Olympics
Olympic bronze medalists for Russia
Olympic basketball players of Russia
1981 births
Olympic medalists in basketball
Basketball players at the 2012 Summer Olympics
Medalists at the 2008 Summer Olympics
Medalists at the 2004 Summer Olympics